Eureka! is a Canadian educational television series which was produced and broadcast by TVOntario in 1980 and 1981. The series was narrated by Billy Van, and featured a series of animated vignettes which taught physics lessons to children. It is currently available online.

Synopsis

Eureka! is a series of animated shorts that illustrate concepts in physics. Each program takes a simple and direct approach to the subject matter; while the basic concepts are explained in a voice-over, cartoon characters and a variety of animated objects demonstrate the principles on the screen. Constant review and reinforcement make the message clear; as a result, the study of physics becomes easy and accessible - even to viewers without a solid background in the subject. Basic formulae and concepts are introduced with a recap of what was learnt in the previous episode to build knowledge on a topic and create connections.

Production

Animation - Grafilm Productions Inc.

Design - Joe Meluck

Educational Consultants - John Kuropatwa, Paul Henshall, Bryan Kaufman, Ernie McFarland, Michael Broschart

Unit Manager - Vickie Gilchrist

Production Assistant - George Pyron

List of episodes

30 episodes were produced. All of the episodes are five minutes in length.

Unit 1: Force and Energy

Inertia
Mass
Speed
Acceleration I
Acceleration II
Gravity
Weight vs Mass
Work
Kinetic Energy
Potential Energy and Speed

Unit 2: Simple Machines

The Inclined Plane
The Lever
Mechanical Advantage and Friction
The Screw and the Wheel
The Pulley

Unit 3: Heat and Temperature

Molecules in Solids
Molecules in Liquids
Evaporation and Condensation
Expansion and Contraction
Measuring Temperature
Temperature vs Heat

Unit 4: The Conduction of Heat

Atoms
Electrons
Conduction

Unit 5: The Convection of Heat

Volume and Density
Buoyancy
Convection

Unit 6: The Radiation of Heat

Heat as Energy
Radiation Waves
The Radiation Spectrum

External links

Eureka! on Rick's TV

Canadian children's animated education television series
Science education television series
Physics education
TVO original programming
Year of Canadian television series ending missing
Science and technology in Canada
1980s Canadian animated television series
1980 Canadian television series debuts
1981 Canadian television series endings